Philipp Marx and Florin Mergea were the defending champions but decided not to participate together.
Marx partnered with Dustin Brown but lost to Michael Berrer and Franko Škugor in the quarterfinal.
Mergea partnered with Oliver Marach and won the title over Nicholas Monroe and Simon Stadler 6–4, 3–6, [10–7].

Seeds

Draw

Draw

References
 Main Draw

Open de Rennes - Doubles
2013 Doubles